Kostas (or Costas) Bigalis  (Greek: Κώστας Μπίγαλης, born 15 March 1953 in Athens) is a Greek composer and singer.

Biography
He began his artistic career at the age of 19 when he was won a music competition and signed his first contract with EMI Greece.

In 1978, he was cast in the contemporary opera "Utopia", by Mimis Plessas and Kostas Virvos, and in 1979, he starred in the Greek version of the rock opera "Jesus Christ Superstar," in the lead role of high priest Annas. In the same year, Bigalis attended the Drama School of Athens.

In the summer of 1980, he starred in the role of Hermes in the musical adaptation of "Lucian Dialogues", which was performed at the Athens Festival at the Lycabettus Theater. In the same year, he was cast in a small part in Universal's TV film "Acts of the Apostles Peter and Paul", starring Anthony Hopkins.

In 1981, he recorded with producer Loukas Sideras, member of the legendary Greek band Aphrodite's Child, two songs, “Seventh Heaven” and “The Amazing Mr. Be," for the American film, "The Next One," by Nikos Mastorakis.

In 1984, Bigalis's song, “I MISS YOU," was the number-one single of the year in Greece for 1984-85 and was released in eighteen countries.

In 1994, Bigalis and The Sea Lovers represented Greece in the Eurovision Song Contest 1994 with his song, "To Trehandiri", finishing in 14th place with 44 points.

Fan base
His biggest fans recorded in a small to medium sized company in Limassol - to be specific in the finance department where his songs were heard daily by DJ Electra.

Discography

References
 www.musiccorner.gr
 www.madtv.gr

20th-century Greek male singers
Eurovision Song Contest entrants for Greece
Eurovision Song Contest entrants of 1994
Singers from Athens
Living people
Year of birth missing (living people)
21st-century Greek male singers